The qualification for the 2015 FIFA Women's World Cup determined which 23 teams joined Canada, the hosts of the 2015 tournament, to play for the Women's World Cup.

The field was expanded from 16 teams in the 2011 edition to 24 in the 2015 edition. As a result, a new distribution of slots to each confederation was announced by FIFA on 11 June 2012:
AFC (Asia): 5 slots (up from 3)
CAF (Africa): 3 slots (up from 2)
CONCACAF (North/Central America, Caribbean): 3.5+1 (host) slots (up from 2.5)
CONMEBOL (South America): 2.5 slots (up from 2)
OFC (Oceania): 1 slot (same as 2011)
UEFA (Europe): 8 slots (up from 4.5+1)

A record of 134 FIFA member nations (not counting Canada) entered the qualifying tournaments. Additionally two non-FIFA nations entered the CONCACAF qualifying. Four African teams withdrew before playing any match.

Qualified teams

1.The rankings are shown as of 19 September 2014 – the last rankings published prior to the official draw.

Qualifying tournaments

1 30 nations started, but Martinique and Guadeloupe are not eligible for World Cup qualification. They are only members of CONCACAF and not FIFA.

Confederation qualification

AFC

(20 teams competing for 5 berths)

As in the previous World Cup cycle, the 2014 AFC Women's Asian Cup served as the qualifying tournament. A total of 20 AFC teams competed for five berths.

The final tournament, held in Vietnam from 14 to 25 May 2014, was competed by eight teams, four of which – Australia, China, Japan and South Korea – were automatically qualified though their 2010 placement, while the others were determined via a qualification tournament.  North Korea was banned from the tournament due to the sanction on their doping cases in 2011 FIFA Women's World Cup.

Group stage
The top two teams from each group advanced to the semifinals of the tournament as well as qualifying for the World Cup. The third placed teams advanced to a playoff against each other to determine the fifth and final qualifying team from the AFC.

Japan, Australia, China and South Korea qualified for the World Cup. Vietnam and Thailand advanced to the fifth-place play-off.

Fifth place play-off

Thailand qualified for the World Cup.

CAF

(26 teams competing for 3 berths)

As in the previous World Cup cycle, the 2014 African Women's Championship served as the qualification tournament for the Women's World Cup. The qualifying saw a record entry of 25 CAF teams (26 if including final tournament host Namibia). Four teams though withdrew before playing any matches.

A total of eight teams (the host nation and seven teams which came through the qualifying rounds) competed at the final tournament in Namibia from 11 to 25 October 2014. The top three teams of the final tournament qualified for the World Cup.

Knockout stage

Nigeria, Cameroon and Ivory Coast qualified for the World Cup.

CONCACAF

(28 teams competing for 3 or 4 berths, host nation Canada also qualifies)

As with the previous World Cups, the 2014 CONCACAF Women's Championship served as the region's qualification tournament. A total of 30 teams entered qualifying, with Martinique and Guadeloupe not eligible for World Cup qualification as they are only members of CONCACAF and not FIFA. Therefore, a total of 28 teams were in contention for the three direct places plus the play-off place against CONMEBOL's Ecuador. Canada did not participate as they already qualified to the World Cup as hosts.

The final tournament was held in the United States from 15 to 26 October 2014, and the final group draw took place on 5 September. The United States and Mexico received byes to the tournament's final round, where they were joined by Costa Rica and Guatemala from Central America and by Haiti, Jamaica, Martinique, and Trinidad and Tobago from the Caribbean zone. Both finalists and the third placed team qualified automatically to the 2015 Women's World Cup. The fourth placed team advanced to play the third placed team from CONMEBOL for an additional World Cup berth. It was announced during the Final Draw on 5 September that Martinique was not able to advance beyond the group round, and that the next best team would have taken their place in the semifinals if they finished in the top two in their group.

Knockout stage

United States, Costa Rica and Mexico qualified for the World Cup. Trinidad and Tobago advanced to the CONCACAF–CONMEBOL play-off.

CONMEBOL

(10 teams competing for 2 or 3 berths)

As with previous World Cup qualifications, the 2014 Copa América Femenina served as the qualification tournament to the World Cup finals.

All 10 CONMEBOL teams competed in the tournament, held in Ecuador from 11 to 28 September 2014. The top two teams of the second stage qualified directly for the World Cup, while the third placed team advanced to play the fourth placed team from CONCACAF for an additional World Cup berth.

Final stage

OFC

(4 teams competing for 1 berth)

As in the previous World Cup cycle, the 2014 OFC Women's Nations Cup served as the qualifying tournament.

Only four OFC teams played in the tournament, held in Papua New Guinea from 25 to 29 October 2014. That was fewer than in the last four editions of the tournament. The winner qualified.

Final stage

New Zealand qualified for the World Cup.

UEFA

(46 teams competing for 8 berths)

A record 46 UEFA teams entered qualification. The eight lowest teams entered the tournament in the preliminary round and were drawn into two groups of four, played in single round-robin format from 4 to 9 April 2013 in Malta and Lithuania respectively. The winners and runners-up of each group advanced to the group stage.

The group stage was played in home-and-away round-robin format from 20 September 2013 to 17 September 2014. All seven group winners qualified directly to the final tournament, while the four runners-ups with the best record against the sides first, third, fourth, and fifth in their groups advanced to play-off matches for the remaining berth.

The play-off matches were played in home-and-away two-legged format on 25/26 and 29/30 October (semi-finals), and 22/23 and 26/27 November 2014 (finals).

Group stage

Germany, Spain, Switzerland, Sweden, Norway, England and France qualified for the World Cup. Italy, Scotland, Netherlands and Ukraine advanced to the play-offs.

Play-offs

Netherlands qualified for the World Cup.

CONMEBOL–CONCACAF play-off

The play-off was contested between Trinidad and Tobago, CONCACAF's fourth-placed team, and Ecuador, CONMEBOL's third-placed team. The draw for the order of legs was held in Zürich on 22 July 2014. Ecuador hosted the first leg on 8 November 2014, and Trinidad and Tobago hosted the second leg on 2 December 2014.

Ecuador qualified for the World Cup.

References

External links
FIFA website

 
Qualification
FIFA Women's World Cup qualification